Humraaz is a 2002 Indian Hindi-language musical romantic thriller film directed by the duo Abbas–Mustan. It stars Bobby Deol, Akshaye Khanna and Amisha Patel. This film marks the third collaboration between Deol and Abbas–Mustan. The film is inspired from the 1998 movie A Perfect Murder. It was remade in Tamil as Girivalam.

Plot 

While leading a dance troupe, Karan and Priya fall in love and participate in a dance audition and the winner would get the chance of performing on the luxurious Singhania cruise owned by rich businessman Raj Singhania. Jojo Fernandes leader of another troupe wins by cheating in the competition. Soon Karan beats up Jojo and accidentally kills him and is selected to perform. Raj meets Priya at the deck and eventually falls in love with her and proposes to her. It is revealed that Priya and Karan have been scheming to have Raj wed her to get his money.

Meanwhile, another dancer named Harry from the troupe gets wind of their plot and starts to blackmail Karan to give him money or else he will tell Raj about the plan and tell the police about the death of Jojo Fernandes. It was revealed that Karan killed Jojo Fernandes deliberately, rather than the latter dying in an accident. Karan meets him at the designated place to hand him over the money but instead kills him. Unknown to Karan, just before dying, he calls Raj to reveal the truth. The call goes in the voice mailbox since Raj is not in his office.

Affected by the dilemma of choosing a caring husband over personal ambition, Priya meets with an accident while returning home. Raj showers Priya with all his love and care. Priya is overwhelmed to know Raj has kept a fast for two days. Priya tells Karan that she will not go ahead with the divorce. Karan feels betrayed and decides to get his revenge on Priya and Raj. He feigns a call from Harry and acts as if he is being harassed for a bribe. Priya decides to give her jewelry to Karan to save him. However, Karan anonymously calls Raj from a public phone and lies to him that Priya loves Karan and she is giving away the money that she looted from Raj to Karan. Raj follows her and sees that Priya is meeting Karan and handing over her jewelry. Raj misunderstands it. He also finds the recording of Harry later in his office.

Raj blackmails Karan by showing him the tape to kill Priya. Raj explains every point of the plan right up to precise time and says that he will call on the landline as he wants to hear Priya scream while she is dying. Priya, unaware of the plan, decides to confess everything to Raj in an audio recording and replace the tape with the music cassette in Raj's car. She knows that Raj has a habit of listening to music while traveling to the office. In the recordings, she mentions that if Raj has forgiven her, he should give her a call. If not, she will leave him forever.

Raj was discussing a meeting with an employee that day and hence, doesn't listen to the tape. Karan enters the house as planned and waits for the call. At the same time, Priya is also waiting for the call from Raj expecting him to forgive her. Raj calls the landline as planned, an excited Priya answers the phone. Karan attacks her at the same time and ensures Raj can hear her screams. Raj soon listens to the tape as he sits in the car in horror. He rushes to save Priya only to see the police and an ambulance waiting at the house.

It is revealed that Priya is saved and the saviour is none other than Karan; meanwhile, the person who really attacked Priya is a small thief and he is the one who is dead. Karan then tells Raj that by using Harry's cassette, he can prove nothing. He blackmails Raj saying he had recorded the meeting with him about the murder and demands that Raj divorce Priya with large alimony as a part of his ransom plan. Raj goes to meet Karan at a decided spot where he says he is ready to go to jail, but only after Karan is killed. The two men fight and Karan is about to kill Raj but is confronted by Priya. Karan tells her about Raj's plan to kill her, but she says that she is aware of it and she knows about the dark truth of him and regrets befriending him in the first place. Karan subsequently shoots Priya and Raj runs to kill Karan. Karan tries to kill Raj, but it turns out Priya was still alive and she and Raj kill Karan, who dies a slow and difficult death, and finally, Priya and Raj reunite together.

Cast 
Bobby Deol as Raj Singhania
Akshaye Khanna as Karan Malhotra
Ameesha Patel as Priya Singhania
Johnny Lever as Darshan Bhatt
Sheela Sharma as Rosy
Suhasini Mulay as Dadi
Sudhir as Tommy
Jeetu Verma as Jojo Fernandes
Bhairavi Vaidya as Buaji
Sudhir Mishra as Saxena
Dilip Joshi as Gauri Shankar
Firoz Irani in a guest appearance as Uncle
Dinesh Hingoo as Rustom Uncle
Roshan Tirandaz as Shireen
Farhan as Harry

Production 
Before production began, Priyanka Chopra was offered the role of Priya Singhania and she was supposed to make her debut with this film, but she was unable to accept due to prior commitments. Upon her refusal, the role went to Amisha Patel. Abhishek Bachchan was also offered the role of Karan Malhotra, but he opted out for the same reason, causing Akshaye Khanna to grab the role.

Soundtrack 

The soundtrack of Humraaz was composed by Himesh Reshammiya with lyrics by Sudhakar Sharma. According to the Indian trade website Box Office India, with around 2.2 million units sold, this film's soundtrack album was the year's highest-selling Indian Hindi-language soundtrack. The song "Bardaasht Nahi Kar Sakta" was reused as "Nee Yaaro Nee Yaaro" in the Tamil remake Girivalam and it was the only song reused in the Tamil remake.

Reception

Box office 

Humraaz grossed ₹29.7 crore. The film's budget, plus print and advertising costs totaled ₹15 crore.

Critical response
Derek Elley of Variety opined that "A well-played Bollywood mystery-thriller that’s let down only by a lack of visual style, “Humraaz” gets good character mileage from its star trio and fine perfs from two of them (Bobby Deol, Amisha Patel)". Taran Adarsh of Bollywood Hungama gave the film 3 stars out of 5, writing "On the whole, HUMRAAZ has a fresh cast, a riveting script, the grandiose look and several thrilling moments to take you on a joyride for the next three hours. The film has all it takes to appeal to an avid cinegoer who's thirsting for wholesome entertainment. Recommended!" Vivek Fernandes of Rediff.com said that "The directors do take their time establishing the scheme of things, spoonfeeding the audience at times. Also, the experience would be more rivetting, had the film been a little shorter. But such minors flaw, we shall let pass. Humraaz, definitely, merits a dekho". A critic from Sify wrote that "Except that having watched a lot of Hitchcockian plots, one feels let down at the way our filmmakers end a good plot". Chitra Mahesh of The Hindu opined that "Though the end is filmy and long drawn out, the suspense is tangible".

Awards and nominations 
Below is an incomplete list showing the awards and nominations received by Humraaz:

References

External links 
 

2002 films
2000s Hindi-language films
2002 drama films
Films directed by Abbas–Mustan
Films scored by Himesh Reshammiya
Indian remakes of American films
Hindi films remade in other languages